Ndilǫ  is a First Nations community in the North Slave Region of the Northwest Territories, Canada. The small Dene community is located on the edge of Yellowknife on the tip of Latham Island. It had a population of approximately 321 people in 2016. Ndilǫ and Dettah are the communities of the Yellowknives. Ndilǫ is represented by the Yellowknives Dene First Nation (Ndilǫ) and are part of the Akaitcho Territory Government.

The land was set aside for use by status Indians by the Government of Canada in 1947 and was called 'Lot 500' on the official register. In 1959, the government built the first ten permanent houses for Dene families. They were colourful homes and so people began referring to the community as 'Rainbow Valley'. In the 1970s there were 200 residents living in 20 houses. The name was officially changed to Ndilǫ in 1991, which means "end of the island" in the local Dene dialect.

Climate
Ndilǫ has a subarctic climate (Dfc) with mild to warm summers and long cold winters.

Noted residents
Michel Sikyea

References

External links
Weledeh Yellowknives Dene - A History
Yellowknives Dene First Nation

Communities in the North Slave Region
Dene communities